James Moody is a self-titled album by saxophonist James Moody recorded in 1959 and released on the Argo label.

Reception

Tim Sendra of Allmusic reviewed the album stating: "This record is a fine example of what makes Moody so wonderful; his exuberance, thoughtfulness, and soul make him one of the greats. If you haven't discovered him yet, this is a good place to start. If you're already hip to the man, this is a vital addition to your collection".

Track listing 
All compositions by James Moody, except as indicated
 "Darben the Redd Foxx" - 3:53    
 "Little Girl Blue" (Lorenz Hart, Richard Rodgers) - 3:11    
 "Casbah" Tadd Dameron - mis titled as ''Out of Nowhere" (Johnny Green, Edward Heyman) - 6:31    
 "Daahoud" (Clifford Brown) - 6:00    
 "Yesterdays" (Otto Harbach, Jerome Kern) - 4:05    
 "Cookie" (Gene Kee) - 2:41    
 "With Malice Toward None" (Tom McIntosh) - 3:21    
 "R.B.Q." (Gene Kee) - 8:11

Personnel 
James Moody - alto saxophone (track 3) tenor saxophone, (tracks 4,6 and 8) and flute (1,2,5 and 7)
Johnny Coles - trumpet
Tom McIntosh - trombone
Musa Kaliem - baritone saxophone 
Gene Kee - piano
John Latham - bass
Clarence Johnston - drums

References 

James Moody (saxophonist) albums
1959 albums
Argo Records albums